Ondřej Štyler and Naoki Tajima won the boys' doubles tennis title at the 2018 French Open, defeating Ray Ho and Tseng Chun-hsin in the final, 6–4, 6–4.

Nicola Kuhn and Zsombor Piros were the defending champions, however Kuhn chose not to participate, while Piros is no longer eligible to participate in junior tournaments.

Seeds

Draw

Finals

Top half

Bottom half

External links 
 Draw

Boys' Doubles
2018